Sibyl Kempson (born 1973) is an American playwright and performer, who received the 2018 PEN/Laura Pels International Foundation for Theater Award for an American Playwright in Mid-career.

Kempson was raised in Pequannock Township, New Jersey.

Academics and fellowships
She received her B.F.A. in 1995 from Bennington College.  
She received her M.F.A. in 2007 from Brooklyn College.
She is a MacDowell Colony Fellow.
She has taught at Brooklyn College, The New School, and Sarah Lawrence College.
She is a 2014 USA Rockefeller Fellow.

Collaborators
New York City Players, Elevator Repair Service, Big Dance Theater, Advanced Beginner Group, Mike Iveson, Rude Mechanicals (theater company), Salvage Vanguard, Physical Plant, Rubber Rep.
She is a member of New Dramatists, class of 2017.

Plays

The Wytche of Problymm Plantation
Bad Girls, Good Writers
The Secret Death of Puppets (or) How Do Puppets Die? (or) Puppets Die In Secret
Ich, Kürbisgeist
Potatoes of August
Crime or Emergency
Restless Eye
So Much To Go Crazy
River of Gruel, Pile of Pigs: The Requisite Gesture(s) of Narrow Approach

References

External links
"Baby, They Were Born To Run (Faster!)", NYTimes
"It Could Be a Garden Party, Even the Final One", NYTimes
"What's Afoot in a Garbled Pumpkin Patch", NYTimes
New York City Players official website, Sibyl Kempson bio
Elevator Repair Service Theater official website
Soho Rep Bookshop
53rd State Press official website

1973 births
21st-century American dramatists and playwrights
Bennington College alumni
Brooklyn College alumni
Living people
People from Pequannock Township, New Jersey